The Day Life Began is the tenth studio album by American singer Regina Belle. It was released by Shanachie Records on January 22, 2016. Belle's first album in four years as well as her debut with Shanachie, the album peaked at number 11 on the US Top Gospel Albums.

Critical reception
Justin Kantor from SoulTracks wrote that "the production budget may be tighter than on previous records, but Belle demonstrates the purity and classiness fans crave from her on a well-rounded, ten-song set  sophisticated melodies and thought-provoking lyrics. Primary album producers The Heavyweights provide Belle with feel-good tracks that complement the celebratory nature of her interpretations on numbers ranging in tone from the funky "It’s Alright" to the lush, mellow "You"."

Track listing

Charts

References

2016 albums

Regina Belle albums
Shanachie Records albums